On 6 November 1986, a Boeing-Vertol Model 234LR Chinook helicopter returning workers from the Brent oilfield crashed on approach to land at Sumburgh Airport in the Shetland Islands. At  from the runway the helicopter had a catastrophic forward transmission failure which caused the tandem rotor blades to collide. The helicopter crashed into the sea and sank. Forty-three passengers and two crew members were killed in the crash; one passenger and one crew member survived with injuries.

History
The helicopter was normally based at Aberdeen Airport but had been based at Sumburgh Airport since 3 November 1986 to operate a shuttle service from the Brent oilfield in the East Shetland Basin. On 6 November the first flight was delayed due to an oil leak from an engine gearbox that was soon rectified and the aircraft left Sumburgh at 08:58 with 40 passengers for the Brent Field. The aircraft visited three platforms with exchanges of freight and passengers then departed Brent Platform C at 10:22 with 44 passengers on board for return to Sumburgh Airport. Reporting  from the airfield, the controller cleared it to land on helicopter runway 24. Nothing else was heard.

Accident
The voice recorder indicated that the crew noticed an increased noise level in the flightdeck followed by a bang. The helicopter hit the sea, broke up and sank. A Coastguard search and rescue Sikorsky S-61 helicopter which had just departed Sumburgh Airport on training flight reported liferafts in the sea. It then observed a survivor clinging to a substantial piece of wreckage. While they winched the man on board another survivor was noted among the floating bodies. With no signs of other survivors the Coastguard helicopter flew the survivors to Lerwick for transfer to hospital. An air and sea search failed to find any more survivors but all the floating bodies were recovered and brought to the airport. One of the flight crew and the flight attendant were among the dead.

Recovery
A diving support vessel, the MSV Deepwater 1 (now named Rockwater 1), started a search for the sunken wreckage at 09:00 the following morning.  Sea conditions were rough with strong tidal currents and a water depth around 90 metres but the wreckage was located.  The monohulled Deepwater 1 struggled to maintain position in the building sea and current conditions.  Shell Expro's Multi Services Vessel, the MSV Stadive, arrived and assumed the role of primary recovery vessel and, being a semi-submersible, was able to quickly recover the major components of interest.  By the evening of 10 November the cockpit voice recorder, the cockpit section of the fuselage, the rotors and rotor heads, and the gearboxes and associated control systems had been recovered and transferred to the Deepwater 1, which departed for Aberdeen to pass her cargo onwards for analysis by the Air Accidents Investigation Branch (AAIB).  The Stadive remained on site and recovered much of the remainder of the fuselage and the bodies of the victims.  In all, 44 of the 45 victims' bodies were recovered.

Cause
The accident was caused by the failure of a modified bevel ring gear in the forward transmission which allowed the twin rotors to collide when synchronisation was lost.  The AAIB stated that the underlying causes were the inadequacy of a previously accepted test programme and the failure of a stringent inspection programme.

Safety recommendations
The board made three recommendations:

 Certification procedures be reviewed so that all modifications to vital components are adequately scrutinised and tested before approval and more closely monitored after their introduction into service.
 The Civil Aviation Authority should report on the progress that has been made towards the early incorporation of a specification for suitable condition monitoring systems into airworthiness requirements for helicopters and indicate the time scale and scope of likely developments.
 Requirements relating to the ADELT (Automatically Deployable Location Transmitter) equipment, including location, crashworthiness, protection and power supplied, be reviewed in the light of the accident.  (The beacon did not operate due to impact damage to the aft part of the aircraft.)

Aftermath
The oil industry decided that the Chinook was too big for the offshore support task and the remaining Chinooks were withdrawn and sold.  All surviving aircraft now operate with Columbia Helicopters in heavy lift, non-passenger capabilities.

See also
Other North Sea helicopter incidents:
 Bristow Helicopters Flight 56C (1995)
 Helikopter Service Flight 451 (1997)
 Bond Offshore Helicopters Flight 85N (2009)
 CHC Helikopter Service Flight 241 (2016)

References

External links
 G-BWFC on Airliners.net

British International Helicopters Chinook
Aviation in Shetland
British International Helicopters Chinook
Aviation accidents and incidents in Scotland
1986 disasters in the United Kingdom
Helicopters Chinook Crash
Accidents and incidents involving the Boeing Chinook
British International Helicopters accidents and incidents
November 1986 events in the United Kingdom